Qazlian (also Romanized as Qāzlīān and Qāzilyān; also known as Kasaliah and Qāzelyāh) is a village in Akhtachi Rural District, in the Central District of Bukan County, West Azerbaijan Province, Iran. At the 2006 census, its population was 439, in 70 families.

References 

Populated places in Bukan County